Adina  (עדינה) is a feminine given name of Hebrew origin. The Hebrew word עדינה means "gentle" or "mild".

Notable people with the name include:

 Adina, in Jewish tradition, is the mother of Rachel and Leah, while another, Adina daughter of Yovav ben Yoktan, is the wife of Levi
 Adina (biblical figure), male given name spelled עדינא, listed in I Chronicles 11:42 as one of the "mighty men" of King David's army
 Adina (singer), Ghanaian musician
 Adina Anton (born 1984), Romanian long jumper who competed in the 2004 Summer Olympics
 Adina Bar-On (born 1951), Israeli performance artist
 Adina Bar-Shalom (born 1945 or 1946), Israeli educator, columnist and social activist
 Adina Bastidas (born 1943), Venezuelan economist active in politics
 Adina Beg (died 1758), Governor of the Punjab
 Adina Fohlin (born 1984), Swedish model and photographer
 Adina Giurgiu (born 1994), Romanian women's footballer
 Adina Hoffman (born 1967), American essayist, critic, and biographer
 Adina Howard (born 1973), American singer and songwriter
 Adina Izarra (born 1959), Venezuelan musician, music educator and composer
 Adina Mandlová (1910–1991), Czech actress, sex-symbol, and European movie star
 Adina Laura Meiroșu (born 1985), Romanian handballer
 Adina Porter (born 1971), American actress
 Adina Salaoru (born 1989), Romanian female volleyball player
 Adina Tal (active from 1985), Swiss-born Israeli actress, playwright and theater director
 Adina-Ioana Vălean (born 1968), Romanian politician and social activist

See also 
 Adina (disambiguation)
 Adena (name)
 Edina (name)
 Idina

References 

Feminine given names
Romanian feminine given names
Hebrew-language given names